Carlos Rodríguez Portela (born 11 February 1987), commonly known as Carlos Caloi is a Spanish footballer who plays for CD Choco as a midfielder.

Career
Born in Pontevedra, Caloi kicked off his career in Spain with Tercera División side Alondras. In 2011, he moved to fellow club Choco.

In May 2014, Caloi moved abroad for the first time and signed for Finnish club Honka where he joined fellow Spaniard Pablo Couñago. He scored his debut goal for the club in a 4–1 defeat against Mariehamn. In December, it was announced that Honka was relegated from the Veikkausliiga as they failed to pay a debt of 600,000 euros.

Caloi moved to Finnish second tier club PK-35 in 2015 joining a host of Spanish compatriots. The season ended with the club winning promotion to Veikkausliiga. In July 2016, he returned to Spain and signed for Segunda División B club Coruxo. He left the club the following January and returned to Choco.

In June 2015, Caloi switched clubs and countries and resigned for Finnish club Honka.

References

External links

1987 births
Living people
Association football midfielders
Spanish footballers
Spanish expatriate footballers
Coruxo FC players
FC Honka players
PK-35 Vantaa (men) players
Segunda División B players
Tercera División players
Veikkausliiga players
Ykkönen players
Spanish expatriate sportspeople in Finland
Expatriate footballers in Finland